Joel Axel Krister Voelkerling Persson (born 15 January 2003) is a Swedish professional footballer who plays as a centre-forward for Serie A club Lecce.

Club career

Born in Dalköpinge, Sweden, Voelkerling Persson spent the first part of his youth career at local club Trelleborg, before joining the youth sector of Serie A side Roma in January 2019, following a successful trial at the Italian club. Initially assigned to the under-17 squad, the centre-forward came through Roma's youth ranks, then renewing his contract with the club in the summer of 2020.

During the 2021–22 season, Voelkerling Persson started training with Roma's first team under manager José Mourinho, as he received his first call-ups to the senior squad for Serie A and UEFA Europa Conference League matches, without making any appearance. In the same campaign, he was part of Roma's under-19 squad that reached the final of the national championship, before losing to Inter Milan.

On 13 July 2022, Voelkerling Persson joined newly-promoted Serie A side Lecce on a permanent deal, signing a five-year contract with the club. The transfer reportedly commanded a transfer fee of almost one million euros, with a 50% sell-on clause and a counter-option to buy in favor of Roma.

After struggling with injuries in the first half of the 2022–23 season, the forward made his professional (and Serie A) debut on 14 January 2023, coming on as a substitute for Lorenzo Colombo in the 72nd minute of a 2–2 home draw against Milan.

International career 
Voelkerling Persson has represented Sweden at youth international level, having played for the under-19 national team.

Personal life 
He has an older brother, Jakob, who is also a professional footballer and plays as a defender.

Career statistics

Club

References

External links

 
 
 

2003 births
Living people
Swedish footballers
Association football forwards
Sweden youth international footballers
Trelleborgs FF players
A.S. Roma players
U.S. Lecce players
Swedish expatriate footballers
Expatriate footballers in Italy
Swedish expatriate sportspeople in Italy
Serie A players